Cosimo Chiricò (born 5 October 1991) is an Italian professional footballer who plays as a winger or attacking midfielder for  club Crotone.

Club career

Lecce 
After having loan spells away, he became a member of Lecce's first team squad for the 2012–13 Lega Pro Prima Divisione season. He scored his first goal for the club in a 2–0 win over San Marino on 16 September and his second goal a week later in a 3–1 win against Treviso.

Parma 
In summer 2013 Chiricò was signed by Serie A club Parma. On 29 July 2013 he was signed by Serie B club Latina on a temporary deal, joining Riccardo Brosco and Alessandro Iacobucci also from Parma.

On 20 June 2014 Chiricò and Cristian Dell'Orco were signed by Ascoli.

Prato 
In October 2015 Cosimo signed for Prato.

Foggia 
In January 2016 Cosimo signed for Foggia. He signed a new 3-year contract on 10 July 2017. However, on 31 January 2018 he was released by Foggia in a mutual consent.

Cesena
On 5 February 2018, he signed a contract with Cesena, until the end of season. He was assigned number 9 shirt, which was owned by Ettore Gliozzi.

Lecce
On 9 July 2018 he was signed by his former club Lecce, but made just one appearance in the Serie B.

Serie C
On 4 January 2019 he was signed by Monza on a permanent basis.

Return to Ascoli
On 23 September 2020 he returned to Ascoli on a permanent basis.

Back to Serie C
On 1 February 2021, he joined Serie C side Padova on loan. On 7 July 2021, he transferred to Padova on a permanent basis.

On 29 June 2022, Chiricò signed a three-year contract with Crotone.

Honours 
Monza
 Serie C Group A: 2019–20

References

External links 
 Lega Serie B profile 
 
 

1991 births
Living people
People from Brindisi
Footballers from Apulia
Italian footballers
Association football forwards
Association football wingers
Association football midfielders
Serie B players
Serie C players
Serie D players
U.S. Lecce players
S.S.D. Città di Brindisi players
Vigor Lamezia players
S.S. Virtus Lanciano 1924 players
Parma Calcio 1913 players
Latina Calcio 1932 players
Ascoli Calcio 1898 F.C. players
A.C. Prato players
Calcio Foggia 1920 players
A.C. Cesena players
A.C. Monza players
Calcio Padova players
F.C. Crotone players
Sportspeople from the Province of Brindisi